Sepia sewelli is a species of cuttlefish native to the western Indian Ocean, from Cape Guardafui, Somalia ( to ) to Zanzibar and probably Madagascar. It lives at depths of 37 to 238 m.

Sepia sewelli grows to a mantle length of 30 mm.

The type specimen was collected near Cape Guardafui ( to ) and is deposited at The Natural History Museum in London.

References

External links

Cuttlefish
Molluscs described in 1966